Noel Pullen (born 9 December 1944, in Essendon, Victoria) was an Australian politician, and was a member of the Victorian Legislative Council for the Australian Labor Party (ALP). Prior to becoming an MP, Pullen was a banker and is an Essendon Football Club supporter.

Pullen was the only ALP representative ever elected to the seat of Higinbotham before it was abolished under the Legislative Council reforms carried out by the Bracks Labor government. During 2004, Pullen conducted a review related to the idea the Bracks Government had of introducing laws requiring car makers to offer an exchange vehicle or refund if a new car turned out to be a dud requiring repeated repairs to correct serious manufacturing defects.

Pullen was not preselected for the new South Eastern Metropolitan Region of the Legislative Council for the 2006 state election, and instead chose to run against Liberal MP Murray Thompson in the Legislative Assembly seat of Sandringham. Pullen failed to be elected.

When the Bracks government intended make legalising abortion a policy at the 2006 Victorian state election, Pullen supported an amendment proposed by Christine Campbell to consider the effects of late-term abortion.

References

1944 births
21st-century Australian politicians
Australian Labor Party members of the Parliament of Victoria
Living people
Members of the Victorian Legislative Council
Politicians from Melbourne
People from Essendon, Victoria